Faustino "Inno" Dy V is a Filipino politician who is currently serving as the Representative of Isabela's 6th district since 2019. He previously served as the National president of Liga ng mga Barangay from 2018 to 2019.

References 

Members of the House of Representatives of the Philippines from Isabela (province)
Living people
Year of birth missing (living people)
21st-century Filipino politicians